Alice Cooper (4 August 1846 – 17 June 1917) was a British headmistress. She was the first head at the Edgbaston High School for Girls. This was the first girls' secondary school open to the public in Birmingham. Cooper encouraged cricket and science for her students. Cooper then worked to improve the education and to train secondary teachers in Oxford.

Life
Cooper was born in Doncaster in 1846. She was the first daughter of the Reverend John Thomas Cooper and his wife Ann. She was a Unitarian like her parents and she took Cambridge higher exams and became second mistress at the Girls' Day School Trust's Notting Hill High School for Girls in 1875.

Cooper then became the first headmistress of Edgbaston High School for Girls. The school was founded in 1876 by liberals that included Unitarians and Quakers. It was the first girls' secondary school open to the public in Birmingham.

Cooper strongly encouraged the teaching of science, sensible clothing and physical exercise. In 1881, the school staged a cricket match against another school, to which a local newspaper reacted with hostility. It produced a cartoon and wrote a passage of its opinions towards the match. The paper argued that girls should be taught modesty and not science or competition.

Cooper exchanged letters with Lewis Carroll (aka Charles Dodgson) and when the school arranged a performance of his play he agreed to attend. In his letter he said that he hoped to "kiss the Alice of the play" but this "should not be permitted on any account!".

Cooper resigned her position in 1895, but not to retire. Since 1891, she had been on the council of the emerging Somerville College. Cooper was to be the first female academic to be employed in Oxford where she gave private lessons to aspiring students who wished to teach in secondary schools.

Cooper died her home in Beaconsfield in 1917.

References

1846 births
1917 deaths
People from Doncaster
Women school principals and headteachers
Heads of schools in England
People associated with Somerville College, Oxford